Desmond Dube is a South African singer, actor, mime artist and entertainer. He is known for his work in The No. 1 Ladies' Detective Agency, Hotel Rwanda, Friends Indeed, Suburban Bliss and Joburg Blues.

He is a trained theatrical actor and has appeared in both commercial and street theatre. On stage he played the lead in Jozi Jozi, Peto and the musical Street Sisters, and also appeared in the poorly received stage play Joseph and the Amazing Technicolour Dreamcoat. He appeared in industrial theatre productions for Eskom, Siyabonga and the AIDS Show. He is best known for his role in the "Amaglugglug" commercial for SASOL.

Dube starred in the feature film Inside and Tarzan: The Epic Adventures, and starred alongside Leon Schuster in Panic Mechanic and Millennium Menace.

In 2002, he starred opposite Oscar nominee Armin Mueller-Stahl and Nthati Moshesh in The Long Run, which was produced by Anant Singh. The film was acquired by Universal Focus, the speciality division of Universal Films for distribution worldwide excluding Africa.

Dube on Monday, one of the most popular comedy variety shows on television in South Africa, is broadcast on SABC 3. It is billed as South African television's first local post-weekend "beat the Monday blues" comedy variety show which appeals to all South Africans. However, poor reviews from a number of critics have led to continued calls for the show to be cancelled.

Dube has received the Avanti Award for Best Comedy Actor in Joburg Blues, an Avanti Award nomination for Best Supporting Actor in Suburban Bliss, a Stellenbosch Festival Best Supporting Actor and Promising Writer Award, and a Loerie Award for Best Contribution for his role in the SASOL "Amaglugglug" commercial.

In 2004, he was cast in a lead role in the Academy Award-nominated Hotel Rwanda, starring alongside Nick Nolte and Don Cheadle.

In 2008, Dube starred as BK alongside Jill Scott, Anika Noni Rose and Lucian Msamati in The No. 1 Ladies' Detective Agency, directed by Anthony Minghella.

See also
Dube on 2
SABC

External links
 TVSA actor profile
 

Living people
South African male film actors
South African male comedians
1969 births